The 2021 Copa CONMEBOL Libertadores Femenina was the 13th edition of the CONMEBOL Libertadores Femenina (also referred to as the Copa Libertadores Femenina), South America's premier women's club football tournament organized by CONMEBOL.

The competition initially was scheduled to be played from 30 September to 16 October 2021 in Chile. On 29 July 2021, CONMEBOL announced that although the other rounds would be played in Chile, the final match would be played at the Estadio Centenario in Montevideo, Uruguay on 24 November 2021. Thus, the final would be played between the 2021 Copa Sudamericana and the men's 2021 Copa Libertadores finals that would also be played in Montevideo. The tournament organizers did not agree with this decision and on 3 August 2021 they communicated to CONMEBOL that Chile would not host the championship. On 13 August 2021, CONMEBOL confirmed that the competition would be played from 3 to 21 November 2021, with Paraguay hosting the competition up to the third place play-off and the final being played at Estadio Centenario in Montevideo. Finally, on 10 September 2021, CONMEBOL announced that the final match was moved to the Estadio Gran Parque Central in Montevideo. Ferroviária were the defending champions, but they were eliminated in the semi-finals.

Corinthians (Brazil) defeated Santa Fe (Colombia) 2–0 to win their third title. In the Final, VAR was used for the first time in a Copa Libertadores Femenina match.

Alianza Lima became the first Peruvian team to qualify for the single-elimination stages. After their elimination in the quarter-finals, Kindermann ended their partnership with Avaí and the team was disbanded in November 2021. In January 2022 Avaí took control and assured the continuity of the team during 2022.

Format
For the group stage, the 16 teams were drawn into four groups. Teams in each group played one another in a round-robin basis, with the top two teams of each group advancing to the quarter-finals. Starting from the quarter-finals, the teams played a single-elimination tournament.

Teams
The competition was contested by 16 teams:
the champions of all ten CONMEBOL associations
the title holders
an additional team from the host association
four additional teams from associations with the best historical performance in the tournament (associations in bold receive two berths according to the points total until the 2020 edition).
Brazil: 220 points
Chile: 136 points
Colombia: 120 points
Paraguay: 104 points
Argentina: 90 points
Venezuela: 77 points
Ecuador: 60 points
Uruguay: 43 points
Bolivia: 38 points
Peru: 29 points

Notes

Venues
Matches in the competition were played at Estadio Manuel Ferreira and Estadio Arsenio Erico, both in Asunción, Paraguay, except for the final which was played at Estadio Gran Parque Central in Montevideo, Uruguay.

Match officials
On 21 September 2021, CONMEBOL announced the referees and assistant referees appointed for the tournament.

Draw
The draw for the tournament was held on 24 September 2021, 12:00 PYT (UTC−4), at the CONMEBOL Convention Center in Luque, Paraguay. The 16 teams were drawn into four groups of four.

Two teams were directly assigned to the head of groups A and B.

To Group A: as 2020 Copa Libertadores Femenina champions, Ferroviária (Brazil 1)
To Group B: as champions of the host association, Cerro Porteño (Paraguay 1)

The remaining teams (excluding the four teams from national associations with an extra berth) were seeded into three pots based on the final placement of their national association's club in the previous edition of the tournament, excluding the champions, with the highest two (Colombia 1 and Brazil 2) placed in Pot 1, the next four (Chile 1, Argentina, Paraguay 2 and Peru) placed in Pot 2 and the lowest four (Uruguay, Ecuador, Venezuela and Bolivia) in Pot 3. The four additional teams from associations with the best historical performance (Brazil 3, Chile 2, Colombia 2 and Paraguay 3) were seeded into Pot 4. From Pot 1, the first team drawn was placed into group C and the second team drawn placed into group D, both teams assigned to position 1 in their group. From each remaining pot, the first team drawn was placed into Group A, the second team drawn placed into Group B, the third team drawn placed into Group C and the final team drawn placed into Group D, with teams from Pot 2, 3 and 4 assigned to positions 2, 3 and 4 in their group. Teams from the same association could not be drawn into the same group.

The draw resulted in the following groups:

Group stage
In the group stage, the teams were ranked according to points (3 points for a win, 1 point for a draw, 0 points for a loss). If tied on points, tiebreakers would be applied in the following order (Regulations Article 23).
Goal difference;
Goals scored;
Head-to-head result in games between tied teams;
Number of red cards;
Number of yellow cards;
Drawing of lots.

The winners and runners-up of each group advanced to the quarter-finals.

All times are local, PYST (UTC−3).

Group A

Group B

Group C

Group D

Final stages
Starting from the quarter-finals, the teams played a single-elimination tournament. If tied after full time, extra time would not be played, and the penalty shoot-out would be used to determine the winners (Regulations Article 25).

Bracket

Quarter-finals

Semi-finals

Third place match

Final
Daniela Arias (Santa Fe) was inscribed on the tournament but she did not play due to injury. Érika (Corinthians) was ruled out of the final due to ACL injury of her right knee.

Statistics

Top goalscorers

Final ranking
As per statistical convention in football, matches decided in extra time were counted as wins and losses, while matches decided by penalty shoot-out were counted as draws.

2021 Copa Libertadores Femenina team
The 2021 Copa Libertadores Femenina team was a squad consisting of the eleven most impressive players at the tournament.

See also
2021 AFC Women's Club Championship
2021 WAFF Women's Clubs Championship
2021 CAF Women's Champions League
2020–21 UEFA Women's Champions League
2021 Copa Libertadores

References

External links
CONMEBOL Libertadores Femenina 2021, CONMEBOL

2021
2021 in women's association football
2021 in South American football
International club association football competitions hosted by Paraguay
November 2021 sports events in South America